Prosenoides flavipes is a species of bristle fly in the family Tachinidae. It is found in North America.

References

Insects described in 1895
Dexiinae
Diptera of North America
Taxa named by Daniel William Coquillett